Lough Barra Bog is a blanket bog, Ramsar site and national nature reserve of approximately  in County Donegal.

Features
Lough Barra Bog was legally protected as a national nature reserve by the Irish government in 1987. In 1987, the site was also declared Ramsar site number 373.

The Bog is a lowland blanket bog in the upper Gweebarra river valley on the southern edge of Glenveagh National Park. It provides a habitat for three bird species protected under the EC Bird Directive, Greenland white-fronted Goose, merlin and golden plover. Adjacent to Lough Barra Bog is the Ramsar site and nature reserve, Meenachullion Bog, making it part of the largest area of intact lowland blanket bog of the northwest of Ireland. The reserve contains many flushes, small pools, and some remaining native deciduous woodland, predominantly made up of Quercus petraea.

References

Bogs of the Republic of Ireland
Landforms of County Donegal
Protected areas of County Donegal
Tourist attractions in County Donegal
Nature reserves in the Republic of Ireland
Protected areas established in 1987
1987 establishments in Ireland
Ramsar sites in the Republic of Ireland